Varketili is a station of the Tbilisi Metro on the Akhmeteli–Varketili Line. It opened in 1981 and was renovated in 2007 and 2017 and 2023. Varketili is the last station on line 1 and is the nearest to the airport.

External links
 Varketili station page at Tbilisi Municipal Portal

Tbilisi Metro stations
Railway stations opened in 1981
1981 establishments in Georgia (country)